Mirco is a masculine given name popular in Italy. Mirco is an alternative spelling of the name Mirko. It may refer to:

 Mirco Antenucci (born 1984), Italian footballer
 Mirco Baldacci (born 1977), rally driver from San Marino
 Mirco Bergamasco (born 1983), Italian rugby player
 Mirco Bertolina (born 1991), Italian cross-country skier
 Mirco Born (born 1994), German footballer
 Mirco Colina (born 1990), Curaçaoan footballer
 Mirco Di Tora (born 1986), Italian swimmer
 Mirco Gasparetto (born 1980), Italian footballer
 Mirco Gennari (born 1966), Sammarinese footballer
 Mirco Gualdi (born 1968), Italian racing cyclist
 Mirco Lorenzetto (born 1981), Italian racing cyclist
 Mirco Lüdemann (born 1973), German ice hockey player
 Mirco Maestri (born 1991), Italian cyclist
 Mirco Mezzanotte (born 1974), Italian ski mountaineer
 Mirco Miori (born 1995), Italian footballer
 Mirco Müller (born 1995), Swiss ice hockey player
 Mirco Poloni (born 1974), Italian footballer
 Mirco Pruyser (born 1989), Dutch field hockey player
 Mirco Reseg (born 1972), German actor and comedian
 Mirco Ruggiero (born 1969), Italian bobsledder
 Mirco Sadotti (born 1975), Italian professional footballer
 Mirco Scarantino (born 1995), Italian weightlifter
 Mirco Severini (born 1997), Italian footballer
 Mirco Spighi (born 1990), Italian footballer
 Mirco Zuliani (born 1953), Italian Air Force officer

See also
 Mirko
 Mirco Games, a pinball and arcade game manufacturer from Phoenix, Arizona that existed from 1969 to 1978

Italian masculine given names
German masculine given names